Miłków  is a village in the administrative district of Gmina Podgórzyn, within Jelenia Góra County, Lower Silesian Voivodeship, in south-western Poland.

Miłków is the location of the ten-sided concrete structure known as the Muchołapka, ("Flytrap") built at the Dynamit Nobel plant during World War II. The structure, also known as The Henge, is associated with the Die Glocke urban myth.

References

Villages in Karkonosze County